Amir Emran (also Romanized as Amīr ‘Emrān and Amīr ‘Omrān; also known as Amīr ol ‘Emrān, Amīr ol Omarā’, Mīr Marān, Mīr ‘Omān, and Mīr Umrān) is a village in Agahan Rural District, Kolyai District, Sonqor County, Kermanshah Province, Iran. At the 2006 census, its population was 389, in 76 families.

References 

Populated places in Sonqor County